Assistant Chief Russell Taylor was a fictional character featured in TNT's The Closer, portrayed by Robert Gossett. Commander Taylor is the Commanding Officer of the Los Angeles Police Department's (LAPD) Robbery-Homicide Division. He is also one of two characters on the show who have real-life equivalents on the LAPD, although his rank is one step higher. A hard worker who has risen through the ranks, he is extremely resentful of Deputy Chief Brenda Leigh Johnson's status and the respect she receives from the officers working with her. He does what he can to undermine her at every turn, under the guise of trying to assist in the case.  In The Closer spin-off, Major Crimes, Taylor becomes the Assistant Chief of Operations for the LAPD. In the episode "White Lies, Part I," Taylor is killed in the line of duty during a courtroom shooting.

Career history
He worked his way up to Captain after 21 years with the LAPD. Before Deputy Chief Brenda Leigh Johnson transferred to Los Angeles, Taylor headed up the Priority Homicide Division. He was removed from that position when too many celebrity cases were handed to the DA with "less than compelling" evidence.

At the end of season 1, Taylor was promoted to the rank of Commander by Chief Pope in return for dropping a "conduct unbecoming an officer" complaint against Deputy Chief Johnson. Since his promotion, Taylor appears to be more willing to work with Johnson and even has asked for her help in a few cases, however he is still a vocal opponent of her condescending attitude.

When Tommy Delk is named Chief of Police Chief of Police, Taylor is about to be named the new Assistant Chief of Operations until Delk's untimely death. After Assistant Chief Pope was appointed Chief of Police and it became clear that Chief Johnson was unfit for the position, Commander Taylor was promoted to Assistant Chief. In Major Crimes, he introduces a new policy of making deals with criminals rather than going to trial to save money. While this is initially unpopular with the squad, except Captain Sharon Raydor, they have adapted to the changes. When giving Raydor the job as head of Major Crimes, both Taylor and Pope promised her a promotion to Commander, but this is revealed to have been a lie due to a hiring freeze. Instead, Taylor states that her taking over Major Crimes is the promotion she was promised.

In "White Lies, Part 1", white supremacist Dwight Darnell opens fire on a courtroom while on trial for murder. Taylor is shot multiple times before Darnell is brought down by Sharon Raydor. Despite the best efforts of Doctor Morales, Taylor dies of his wounds. The Major Crimes squad are deeply affected by his death despite their differences with him.

In "White Lies, Part 3", Fritz Howard tells Sharon Raydor that a park is being built on the location of the condemned buildings once belonging to the Zyklon Brotherhood and it will be dedicated in Taylor's honor. It's also determined that while everyone else shot in the courtroom was part of a conspiracy, Taylor's death was not. Instead, Taylor had drawn his gun in an attempt to stop Darnell and Darnell simply returned fire at him.

Through the second half of season 5, there is a competition between a reluctant Sharon, Deputy Chief Winnie Davis and Commander Leo Mason to replace Taylor as Assistant Chief with Fritz Howard working as Acting Assistant Chief in the interim. In "Shockwave, Part 2", Mason is promoted to take Taylor's place with Fritz returning to his old job as Deputy Chief of SOB. As one of his first acts, Mason grants Sharon the promotion to Commander that Taylor had denied her when she took over Major Crimes.

Personality
Tough and extremely ambitious, Taylor earned the loyalty of his detectives by helping them gain advanced education and promotions. Taylor initially demonstrated resentment and insecurity after he was taken off the Priority Homicide Squad and was passed up for a promotion. Eventually however, he grew to respect Deputy Chief Johnson, even supporting her bid to become Chief of Police.

During the first season of The Closer, Taylor wasn't above sabotaging Johnson. As a Captain, Taylor resented Johnson because after over 20 years on the force, he was a Captain, while Johnson outranked him even with no LAPD experience. Throughout Season 1, Taylor began to lose the respect of many detectives who formerly admired him. It was most evident in Lt. Flynn, once as anti-Brenda as Taylor, soon came around after she defended him in a cold case where his mistakes could have cost him his job and pension while his erstwhile friend Taylor was more than willing to "throw him to the wolves".

In the Season 1 finale of The Closer, then-Captain Taylor files an anonymous complaint against Deputy Chief Johnson for "conduct unbecoming an officer." The charges were clearly without merit, but because they were filed and the fact that the DA's office and the FBI disliked Johnson's methods and attitude, an investigation was instigated by Internal Affairs into Johnson's conduct. But after the charges become a distraction and waste of resources to the LAPD, then-Assistant Chief Will Pope made a deal with Taylor, promoting him to the rank of Commander, one rank below Deputy Chief, if Taylor withdrew the charges. After Taylor's promotion to Commander, he works well with Johnson and her division, despite their past conflicts.

Taylor was temporarily given control of the detectives in the Priority Homicide Division while Deputy Chief Johnson was on administrative leave at the end of season 2, following a shooting incident in the murder room, during which Lt. Provenza's gun was used by a federal protective witness to kill a decorated FBI agent.

Taylor, however, grew to respect Chief Johnson's abilities and even relies on her to solve cases he's most passionate about. As time has passed the two have worked better together and the animosity between their divisions has decreased considerably. In Season 6, Taylor supported Brenda's campaign to become the next Chief of Police, and when Johnson retired from the LAPD, Taylor was visibly emotional.

Following the departure of Chief Johnson, Taylor is promoted to Assistant Chief and begins pushing a new policy of making deals rather than going to trial to save the LAPD money. However, while he at times clashes with the team, he also proves an ally at points such as coming up with a breakthrough that helps solve the Wade Weller case and supporting Sharon and Rusty's familial bond.

Despite his issues with them, the Major Crimes squad was shown to have great regard for Taylor and his death deeply affected all of them. As the squad worked to solve the conspiracy that led to his murder, Taylor was described as a hero by Fritz Howard who stated that his memory would be honored by them catching the people responsible for his death.

Awards and decorations
The following are the medals and service awards fictionally worn by Assistant Chief Taylor.

References

Television characters introduced in 2005
Fictional Los Angeles Police Department officers
The Closer characters